Bijela (Serbian Cyrillic: Бијела) is a coastal town in the municipality of Herceg Novi, Montenegro. It is also located north of Herceg Novi, by the Verige strait in the Bay of Kotor.

The chronicler Andrija Zmajević claimed that the 16th-century Pope Sixtus V descended from a family originating in the area of Bijela. He also stated that the future Pope's father, Piergentile di Giacomo, was born in the village Bjelske Kruševice near Bijela and moved to Italy to escape the Ottoman conquest.

Demographics
The 2003 census recorded a population of 3,748.

According to the 2011 census, its population was 3,691.

Bijela Adriatic Shipyard
Bijela was the home of the Jadransko brodogradilište Bijela, (Montenegrin: Јадранско бродоградилиште Бијела) ("Bijela Adriatic Shipyard"), the largest maintenance and repair shipyard dock in Montenegro. The remains of the bankrupt enterprise were sold off in 2020.

In December 2001 the turbo-electric car ferry Alexander the Great was towed to the shipyard in December 2001 to be converted into a cruise ship, but the project came to a halt and it was not until January 2005 that the ship was towed away.

Sports
The local football club is FK Bijela, who played in Montenegro's third tier but currently only play in youth football. The club played their home games at Stadion Bijela.

References

External links
 Adriatic Shipyard Bijela
 Hotel Delfin, Bijela
 Official web site of Herceg Novi municipality

Populated places in Herceg Novi Municipality
Populated places in Bay of Kotor
Mediterranean port cities and towns in Montenegro
Coastal towns in Montenegro
Serb communities in Montenegro